Monte Pedroso is a granite summit close to Santiago de Compostela, Spain.

Being the highest peak in the vicinity of Santiago it offers excellent views over the town.
Close to the summit spiral-like engravings from Stone or Bronze Age have been found.

External links 
 http://www.artifexbalear.org/petroglifos.htm

Galician Massif
Mountains of Galicia (Spain)